Mexican band RBD's music career began in 2004, during their participation in the telenovela Rebelde. RBD recorded songs for five studio albums in Spanish, six live albums, three albums in Portuguese and one album in English, recording more than 120 songs. Their first work in Spanish, Rebelde, was released in 2004 by EMI Music, which contains 11 songs and four singles.

Unreleased songs

Notes

References

RBD songs
RBD